Arsénio Rodrigues Jardim (1 July 1949 – 4 July 2020), commonly known as Seninho, was a Portuguese professional footballer who played as a right winger.

Club career
Seninho was born in Sá da Bandeira, Portuguese Angola. In his country, he only played with FC Porto, making his Primeira Liga debut in the 1969–70 season, which he ended with 18 games and six goals to help his team to the ninth position. He won the only national championship of his career with the club in 1978, contributing 29 matches and four goals to the feat.

Subsequently, aged 29, Seninho moved to the United States where he remained until his retirement, playing five years with the New York Cosmos and two with the Chicago Sting and winning the North American Soccer League with both sides – three titles with the former.

International career
Seninho won four caps for Portugal in slightly less than two years. His debut came on 7 April 1976, in a 3–1 friendly loss to Italy.

Death
Seninho died on 4 July 2020 at the age of 71, after having been admitted to the University Hospital Center of São João in Porto.

Honours
Porto
Primeira Liga: 1977–78
Taça de Portugal: 1976–77

New York Cosmos
North American Soccer League: 1978, 1980, 1982

Chicago Sting
North American Soccer League: 1984

References

External links

1949 births
2020 deaths
People from Lubango
Portuguese footballers
Association football wingers
Primeira Liga players
FC Porto players
North American Soccer League (1968–1984) players
North American Soccer League (1968–1984) indoor players
New York Cosmos players
Chicago Sting (NASL) players
Portugal international footballers
Portuguese expatriate footballers
Expatriate soccer players in the United States
Portuguese expatriate sportspeople in the United States